The Venerable Mingun Sayadaw U Vicittasārābhivaṃsa (1 November 1911 – 9 February 1993) was a Burmese Theravāda Buddhist monk, best known for his memory skills and his role in the Sixth Buddhist Council.

Early life

Ven. Mingun Sayadaw was born Maung Khin to U Sone and Daw Sin in 1911 in Kyipin Village in Myingyan Township, Mandalay Province, British Burma. His father died when Maung Khin was only 4 years old. During his youth, he was noted for being reserved and his cleanliness.

At the age of 5, he was sent to the village monastery according to Burmese Buddhist tradition, to get a basic monastic education. The presiding sayadaw was U Sasana who had been educated at the Nan Oo Monastery, a prominent monastery in Mandalay.

His grandfather, U Chai taught him Buddhist prayers and recitations. It was for these that he would gain great following and fame as the Mingun Sayadaw. At the age of 7, he was temporarily noviciated as per Theravada tradition, at the Min Kyaung Taik in Myingyan, with U Sobhita as preceptor. Since that age, Maung Khin displayed great memorising ability. He also read a wide array of journals, novels, magazines and books.

Shin Vicittasara

At 10, his mother sponsored his initiation into the Sangha, again under the tutorledge of U Sobhita. He was conferred the monastic name Shin Vicittasara, which means Outstanding in Pali.

At 13, he sat for the Vinaya Examination held by the Sanghasamaggi Association in Myingyan, gaining prominence in the Myingyan religious circle. The next year, he sat for another exam, the Pariyatti Examination where he successfully recited the Abhidhamma from memory to the invigilating senior monks. Afterwards, he sat for various grading religious examinations.

Monkhood and awards

In 1930, Shin Vicittasara moved to Mingun in Sagaing Division to continue his further studies at the Dhammananda Monastery. From that time till his death in 1993, he would be based in Mingun, thus became known as the Mingun Sayadaw. He received great support from a thilashin, Daw Dhammacari. In the same year, he was ordained as a monk with the support of Sir and Lady Thwin. In 1933, he was conferred the rare title of Pahtamakyaw as he passed the Highest level religious Examination at the top of his cohort.

The Maha Sanghasamaggi Association, which conducted the religious exams conferred the suffix Abhivamsa to his name in 1934. Thus, the sayadaw had gained his dhamma name with which he would be renowned throughout Myanmar.

From 1950 to 1953, the sayadaw sat and passed the state conducted Tipitakadhara Selection Examination, for which the government of the newly independent Union of Burma conferred various titles and honours. In 1953, he became the first monk ever to be awarded the title of Tipitakadhara, meaning Keeper and Guardian of the Tipitaka.

Sixth Buddhist Synod

Under the auspices and patronage of the U Nu government, the Sixth Buddhist Council was held in the purpose-built Mahapasana Cave at the Kaba Aye Pagoda in Yangon from 1954 to 1956. Alongside the Venerable Mahasi Sayadaw, the Mingun Sayadaw played a key role in the Sangha Executive Committee. As the "Chief Respondent", he participated in answering all questions concerning the Vinaya, the portion of the Tripitaka dealing with disciplinary rules of the Sangha.

It was said that the sayadaw recalled the exact book, page and line of every term in the Tripitaka.

Later work

At the Request of Prime Minister U Nu and the Buddha Sasana Council, he began work on a treatise on the Life Story of the Buddha, titled the Maha Buddhavamsa from 1955 to 1960. The Maha Buddhavamsa is considered the crowning achievement of the sayadaw's literary work.

In 1979, the Burmese government, now under the rule of General Ne Win and Burma Socialist Programme Party conferred the title of Agga Maha Pandita in recognition of his achievements and contributions. The next year, he served as the chief adviser for the convening of the First All Orders Sangha Congregation - an attempt by the government to rein in the different Buddhist sects in the country.

Guinness Record
In 1985, the Guinness Book of Records recorded the sayadaw as a record holder in the Human memory category. The exact entry was
Human memory: Bhandanta Vicitsara (sic) recited 16,000 pages of Buddhist canonical text in Rangoon, Burma in May 1954. Rare instances of eidetic memory -- the ability to project and hence "visually" recall material-- are known to science.

Last years

The sayadaw was in his 80s when the current military government of Myanmar took power. He distanced himself from the democracy demonstrations and the 8888 movement. As the government solidified its position, the sayadaw was approached by the government to attend its religious events, which he agreed to do so. The sayadaw did not engage in any politics but a few radical elements of the pro democracy movement considered him as a government lackey. However, his reputation was never tarnished as he continued his religious work until the very end.

The sayadaw died in 1993 of complications from an infection. He was given a de facto state funeral, where he was sent off by a large number of fellow monks, government officials and devotees. His ashes were then scattered over various locations across the country to symbolize the national religious figure he had come to personify.

Legacy

The sayadaw has come to embody the Burmese dedication to Buddhism and also of the Burmese Buddhist sangha. His recitations of the Patthana and the suttas are one of the most popular Buddhist audio materials sold in Myanmar.

References

Further reading
 Mingun Sayadaw Biography DVD, Mingun Association Yangon.

External links
Biography of Venerable Mingun Sayadaw
 The Most Venerable Sayadaw U Vicittasarabhivamsa (1911 - 1993)
A Fabulous Memory, Venerable Mingun Saydaw U Vicittasarabhivamsa by Win Pe

1911 births
1993 deaths
Burmese Buddhist monks
Burmese Theravada Buddhists
People from Mandalay Region
Theravada Buddhist monks
20th-century Buddhist monks
Burmese recipients of Agga Maha Pandita
Recipients of Abhivaṃsa